Alain Houpert (born 13 August 1957) is a French radiologist and politician and a member of the Senate of France. He represents the Côte-d'Or department and is a member of the Union for a Popular Movement Party.

References
Page on the Senate website

1957 births
Living people
Politicians from Dijon
French Senators of the Fifth Republic
The Republicans (France) politicians
Union for a Popular Movement politicians
Senators of Côte-d'Or
French radiologists
University of Burgundy alumni
Physicians from Dijon